Ken Whiting (born December 12, 1974), is a Canadian former competitive whitewater kayaker. He won the 1997/98 World Freestyle Kayaking Champion, the 1998 Japan Open Champion, and a five-time Canadian National Champion in freestyle (a.k.a. whitewater) kayaking.

Since 1998, Ken opened a kayaking school, founded the Canadian Freestyle Kayaking Association, and coached the Junior Freestyle Kayaking Team. He produced both the US and Canadian Freestyle Team Trials events, and wrote and produced a series of paddling instructional books and videos. In 2006 he was nominated for an Everest Outdoor Achievement Award. In 2009, Ken produced the first ever kayak fishing TV series, and in 2013, Ken launched Facing Waves, North America's only paddlesport television show.

Early days 
Ken was 14 years old when he picked up a kayak paddle for the first time while taking a five-day kayaking course on the Ottawa River in 1989. At 18 he postponed his university plans to pursue whitewater kayaking.

Championships 
In 1997, he won the World Freestyle Kayaking Championships.

Career 
In 1998, Ken wrote and published The Playboater's Handbook, a reference for freestyle kayaking technique.

Following the great success of the 1st book, Ken teamed up with Chris Emerick, an American videographer, and began producing instructional videos. These publishing efforts evolved into an instructional books and videos series about whitewater kayaking and other outdoor pursuits, including sea kayaking, canoeing, and camping.

In 2002, Ken retired from kayak competition.

In 2009, Ken produced his first TV series, for the World Fishing Network. In that same year, Ken released his first WebTV series.

In 2011, Ken sold Heliconia's book and DVD publishing and distribution arm of the business, in order to focus his energies on TV production, WebTV production and social media marketing.

Ken's company now produces six unique TV series (Kayak Fishing Show, Extreme Kayak Fishing Challenge, Epic Trails, Facing Waves, Kayak Bassin' and Knot Right Kayak Fishing) which air on such networks as FOX Sports, Sportsman Channel, Outside Television, and the World Fishing Network. Heliconia is also a leader in digital content with over 276,000 YouTube subscribers and 67 million views as of June, 2019. 

Ken, his wife Nicole, and their daughter live in the small, rural town of Beachburg, only minutes from the put-in for the Ottawa River. Beachburg is located in "Whitewater Region, Ontario" in the Ottawa Valley.

Promoting paddling 
In 2000, he co-founded an adventure kayaking travel company with a base camp in Chile’s Patagonia region. In 2001, he co-founded another in Canada, which led the new school movement of kayak instruction. Ken's various whitewater projects have taken him to over 200 rivers in fifteen countries, including Japan, Honduras, Guatemala, Chile, Peru, Argentina, New Zealand, and Australia, as well as throughout Europe and North America.

Through his production company, he has influenced over 100,000 paddling participants with his instructional books and DVDs, and his online instructional videos have over 10 million views. Ken also regularly appears in virtually every paddling magazine.

References

1975 births
Canadian male canoeists
Living people